John Fitzgerald and Anders Järryd defeated Javier Frana and Leonardo Lavalle in the final, 6–3, 6–4, 6–7(7–9), 6–1 to win the gentlemen's doubles title at the 1991 Wimbledon Championships. It was Fitzgerald and Järryd's third Wimbledon final in four years.

Rick Leach and Jim Pugh were the defending champions, but lost in the first round to Goran Ivanišević and John McEnroe.

Seeds

  Scott Davis /  David Pate (third round)
  John Fitzgerald /  Anders Järryd (champions)
  Rick Leach /  Jim Pugh (first round)
  Grant Connell /  Glenn Michibata (semifinals)
  Gary Muller /  Danie Visser (second round)
 n/a
  Patrick Galbraith /  Todd Witsken (quarterfinals)
  Todd Woodbridge /  Mark Woodforde (quarterfinals)
  Udo Riglewski /  Michael Stich (first round)
  Luke Jensen /  Laurie Warder (second round)
  Kelly Jones /  Jorge Lozano (second round)
  Paul Haarhuis /  Mark Koevermans (third round)
  Jim Grabb /  Patrick McEnroe (first round)
  Neil Broad /  Kevin Curren (first round)
  Wayne Ferreira /  Piet Norval (semifinals)
  Broderick Dyke /  Peter Lundgren (first round)

Qualifying

Draw

Finals

Top half

Section 1

Section 2

Bottom half

Section 3

Section 4

References

External links

1991 Wimbledon Championships – Men's draws and results at the International Tennis Federation

Men's Doubles
Wimbledon Championship by year – Men's doubles